Catillaria nigroclavata is a species of lichen belonging to the family Catillariaceae. It is mainly found in Europe and North America but is has also been reported from other continents.

Catillaria nigroclavata is an epiphyte which grows on the bark of trees. A study from Greece reported the lichen from near the Fethiye mosque in Ipeiros and Kos Island where it was found growing on the species Pinus pinea and Robinia pseudacacia, on the latter of which it grew alongside the lichen Hyperphyscia adglutinata.

References

Lecanoromycetes
Lichens of Europe
Lichens of North America
Lichen species
Lichens described in 1853
Taxa named by William Nylander (botanist)